Xysticus britcheri is a species of crab spider in the family Thomisidae. It is found in Russia, Canada, and the United States.

References

Thomisidae
Articles created by Qbugbot
Spiders described in 1934